Sindhagatta is a village in the Mandya district of Karnataka state, India.

Location
Sindhagatta is located on the road from Krishnarajpet to Melukote.

PIN code
There is a post office in the village and the postal code is 571426.

Demographics
According to the 2011 census of the Government of India, Sindhagatta village has an area of 1,520 hectares. The total population of the village is 3,464 and there are 828 houses in it.

Constituent suburbs
 Chikkanayakanahalli 	
 Hathimaranahalli
 Kyathanahalli 	
 Maruvanahalli
 Molenahalli 	
 Thammadahalli 	
 Uygonahalli

Gallery

References

Villages in Mandya district